MacKenzie Scott (née Tuttle, formerly Bezos; April 7, 1970) is an American novelist and philanthropist. As of December 2022, she has a net worth of US$27 billion, owing to a 4% stake in Amazon, the company founded by her ex-husband Jeff Bezos. As such, Scott is the third-wealthiest woman in the United States and the 35th-wealthiest individual in the world. Scott was named one of the world's most powerful women by Forbes in 2021, and one of Time's 100 Most Influential People of 2020.

In 2006, Scott won an American Book Award for her 2005 debut novel, The Testing of Luther Albright. Her second novel, Traps, was published in 2013.  She has been executive director of Bystander Revolution, an anti-bullying organization, since she founded it in 2014. Committed to give at least half of her wealth to charity, as a signatory to the Giving Pledge, Scott made US$5.8 billion in charitable gifts in 2020, one of the largest annual distributions by a private individual to working charities. She donated a further $2.7 billion in 2021. As of mid-December 2022, Scott has given a total of $14 billion to over 1600 charitable organizations.

Early life and education 
MacKenzie Scott Tuttle was born on April 7, 1970, in San Francisco, California, to Holiday Robin (née Cuming), a homemaker, and Jason Baker Tuttle, a financial planner. She has two brothers. She was named after her maternal grandfather, G. Scott Cuming, who worked as an executive and general counsel at El Paso Natural Gas. She remembers seriously writing at the age of six, when she wrote The Book Worm, a 142-page book, which was destroyed in a flood.

In 1988, she graduated from the Hotchkiss School in Lakeville, Connecticut. In 1992, Tuttle earned her bachelor's degree in English from Princeton University, where she studied under Nobel Laureate in Literature Toni Morrison, who described Tuttle as "one of the best students I've ever had in my creative writing classes".

Career 
After graduating from college, Tuttle worked as a research assistant to Morrison for the 1992 novel Jazz. She also worked in an administrative role for hedge fund D. E. Shaw in New York City, where she met Jeff Bezos.

Amazon 
In 1993, Scott and Bezos married, and in 1994, they left D. E. Shaw, moved to Seattle, and started Amazon. Scott was one of Amazon's first employees and was heavily involved in Amazon's early days, working on the company's name, business plan, accounts, and shipping early orders. She also negotiated the company's first freight contract. After 1996, Scott took a less involved role in the business, preferring to focus on her family and literary career.

Literary career 
In 2005, Scott wrote her debut novel, The Testing of Luther Albright, for which she won an American Book Award in 2006. She said that it took her ten years to write as she was helping Bezos build Amazon, giving birth to three children, and raising them. Toni Morrison, her former teacher, reviewed the book as "a rarity: a sophisticated novel that breaks and swells the heart". Her second novel, Traps, was published in 2013. According to NPD BookScan, sales of her books were modest.

Personal life 

Scott was married to Jeff Bezos, founder of Amazon and Blue Origin, from 1993 to 2019. She met him while working as his administrative assistant at D.E. Shaw in 1992; after three months of dating, they married and moved from Manhattan to Seattle, Washington, in 1994. They have four children: three sons, and one daughter who is adopted from China.

Their community property divorce in 2019 left Scott with US$35.6 billion in Amazon stock while her former husband retained 75% of the couple's Amazon stock. She became the third-wealthiest woman in the world and one of the wealthiest people overall in April 2019. In July 2020, Scott was ranked the 22nd-richest person in the world by Forbes with a net worth estimated at $36 billion. By September 2020, Scott was named the world's richest woman, and by December 2020, her net worth was estimated at $62 billion.

After her divorce from Jeff Bezos, MacKenzie Bezos changed her name to MacKenzie Scott, with the surname derived from her middle name.

In 2021, Scott married Seattle high school science teacher Dan Jewett. The marriage was revealed in Jewett's Giving Pledge letter posted on March 6, 2021. She filed for divorce from Jewett in September 2022. The divorce was finalized in January 2023.

Philanthropy 
In May 2019, Scott signed the Giving Pledge, a charitable-giving campaign in which she undertook to give away most of her wealth to charity over her lifetime or in her will; despite its name, the pledge is not legally binding.

In a July 2020 Medium post, Scott announced that she had donated $1.7 billion to 116 non-profit organizations, with a focus on racial equality, LGBTQ+ equality, democracy, and climate change. Her gifts to HBCUs, Hispanic-serving institutions, tribal colleges and universities, and other colleges surpass $800 million. In December 2020, less than six months later, Scott stated that she had donated a further $4.15 billion in the previous four months to 384 organizations, with a focus on providing support to people affected by the economic impact of the COVID-19 pandemic and addressing long-term systemic inequities. She said that after July, she wanted her advisory team to give her wealth away faster as the United States struggled with the unprecedented impact of COVID-19 while billionaires' wealth continued to climb. Her team's focus was on "identifying organizations with strong leadership teams and results, with special attention to those operating in communities facing high projected food insecurity, high measures of racial inequity, high local poverty rates, and low access to philanthropic capital". Scott's 2020 charitable giving totaled $5.8 billion, one of the biggest annual distributions by a private individual to working charities.

On June 15, 2021, Scott announced another $2.7 billion in giving to 286 organizations. Forbes reported that Scott donated $8.5 billion across 780 organizations in one year (July 2020 to July 2021). In June 2021, Scott and Melinda French Gates launched the Equality Can't Wait Challenge, a contest to promote gender equality and expanding women's power and influence in the United States by 2030. The four winners received $10 million each and additional $8 million was split between two finalists. In February 2022, nine organizations announced gifts from Scott totaling $264.5 million. On March 23, 2022, more gifts were announced including $436 million to Habitat for Humanity and $275 million to Planned Parenthood. In May 2022, The Big Brothers Big Sisters foundation reported a $122.6 million donation from Mackenzie Scott. Scott also donated to organizations in Kenya, India, Brazil, Micronesia and Latin America. In April 2022, The New York Times reported that Scott donations since 2019 have exceeded $12 billion. In September 2022, Scott donated two of her Beverly Hills homes — worth a combined $55 million — to the California Community Foundation (CCF), which provides grants to mission-based nonprofits in Los Angeles. The organization intends to sell both homes and use 90% of the earnings to fund affordable housing initiatives and the other 10% to an immigrant integration program.
In October 2022, Scott donated $84.5 million to Girl Scouts of the USA and its 29 local councils, making it the largest donation from an individual in the organization’s history. As of November 2022, Scott had donated almost $14 billion to 1500 organizations.

Forbes reported, "the unrestricted and ultimately more trusting nature of Scott's philanthropy is the exception, not the norm in their world." The New York Times noted that "Ms. Scott has turned traditional philanthropy on its head... by disbursing her money quickly and without much hoopla, Ms. Scott has pushed the focus away from the giver, and onto the nonprofits, she is trying to help." Scott stated she believed "teams with experience on the front lines of challenges will know best how to put the money to good use." According to a report from the Center for Effective Philanthropy, slightly more than half of the 277 nonprofit organizations surveyed stated that their grant from Scott has made fundraising easier, with some saying they are able to use it as leverage with other donors and the large gift "has enabled organizations to focus funds where they were most needed to achieve their mission." In December 2021, Scott faced backlash for a Medium post when she stated she would not reveal how much money she has donated or to whom. She subsequently announced that her team would build a website to share details of her philanthropy. In December 2022, she posted the link to her donation database.

Bibliography

See also 
 List of Princeton University alumni

References

Further reading 

 
 

 

1970 births
21st-century American novelists
21st-century American women writers
21st-century philanthropists
Amazon (company) people
American billionaires
American Book Award winners
American women novelists
American women philanthropists
Female billionaires
Giving Pledgers
Hotchkiss School alumni
Living people
Princeton University alumni
Writers from San Francisco
21st-century women philanthropists